The men's horizontal bar competition was one of eight events for male competitors in artistic gymnastics at the 1960 Summer Olympics in Rome. It was held on 5, 7, and 10 September at the Baths of Caracalla. There were 130 competitors from 28 nations, with nations in the team competition having up to 6 gymnasts and other nations entering up to 2 gymnasts. The event was won by Takashi Ono of Japan, the nation's second consecutive victory in the men's parallel bars (tying the United States for second-most all-time). Masao Takemoto gave Japan a second medal with his silver. Ono and Takemoto were the third and fourth men to win multiple medals in the parallel bars; Ono was the first to win two gold medals in the event. Boris Shakhlin of the Soviet Union took bronze.

The 1960 gymnastics competitions introduced apparatus finals, with the all-around competition serving as a qualifying round for the parallel bars final.

Background

This was the 10th appearance of the event, which is one of the five apparatus events held every time there were apparatus events at the Summer Olympics (no apparatus events were held in 1900, 1908, 1912, or 1920). Seven of the top 12 (including ties for 10th) gymnasts from 1956 returned: gold medalist Takashi Ono of Japan, silver medalist Yury Titov of the Soviet Union, bronze medalist Masao Takemoto of Japan, seventh-place finisher Jack Beckner of the United States, eighth-place finisher Albert Azaryan of the Soviet Union, ninth-place finisher Ferdinand Daniš of Czechoslovakia, and tenth-place finisher Stoyan Stoyanov of Bulgaria. Boris Shakhlin of the Soviet Union was the reigning (1958) world champion, with Azaryan second, Titov and Takemoto tied for third, and Ono sixth.

Morocco and South Korea each made their debut in the men's parallel bars; the short-lived United Arab Republic made its only appearance. The United States made its ninth appearance, most of any nation, having missed only the inaugural 1896 Games.

Competition format

The gymnastics all-around events continued to use the aggregation format. Each nation entered a team of six gymnasts or up to two individual gymnasts. All entrants in the gymnastics competitions performed both a compulsory exercise and a voluntary exercise for each apparatus. The scores for all 12 exercises were summed to give an individual all-around score.

These exercise scores were also used for qualification for the new apparatus finals. The two exercises (compulsory and voluntary) for each apparatus were summed to give an apparatus score; the top 6 in each apparatus participated in the finals; others were ranked 7th through 130th. For the apparatus finals, the all-around score for that apparatus was multiplied by one-half then added to the final round exercise score to give a final total.

Exercise scores ranged from 0 to 10, with the final total apparatus score from 0 to 20.

Schedule

All times are Central European Time (UTC+1)

Results

References

Official Olympic Report
www.gymnasticsresults.com
www.gymn-forum.net

Men's Horizontal Bar
Men's 1960
Men's events at the 1960 Summer Olympics